Choi Hyun-mi (born November 7, 1990) is a South Korean female professional boxer. She is a two-weight world champion, having held the WBA female super-featherweight title since 2014 and previously the WBA female featherweight title from 2008 to 2013. As of September 2020, she is ranked as the world's third best active female super-featherweight by The Ring and ninth by BoxRec.

At age 18 Choi was asked to prepare to compete in the 2008 Olympics as a member of the North Korean team; eventually the International Olympic Committee decided against including women's boxing in the competition. In 2004 her father, a successful businessman in North Korea, fled the country, followed by his family, who traveled first through China, then were smuggled through Vietnam before settling in South Korea, where Choi's promoters advertised her as the "Defector Girl Boxer".

Professional career
Choi entered the amateur ranks in South Korea in 2006, winning 5 domestic titles before turning professional in 2007. On October 11, 2008, Choi won the vacant women's featherweight championship of the World Boxing Association by beating Xu Chunyan of China.

On January 23 and 30, 2010, Choi featured in episodes of the popular Korean variety show Infinity Challenge where she successfully defended her WBA Featherweight Women's title against Tenku Tsubasa.

On May 10, 2014, Choi won the women's super featherweight championship of the World Boxing Association by beating Keanpetch Superchamps of Thailand.

Professional boxing record

See also
 List of female boxers

References

Notes
 The Korea Times, 10-12-2008
 Choi Hyun-mi: From N.Korea to Boxing Glory , The Chosun Ilbo, December 29, 2009

External links
 Hyun-mi Choi at Awakening Fighters
 Champion North Korean Boxer, PRI's The World
 
 
 Reuters photo, after winning featherweight championship match

1990 births
Living people
Sportspeople from Pyongyang
South Korean women boxers
North Korean women boxers
North Korean defectors
Super-featherweight boxers
World boxing champions